12 Linden Street is a historic house located in Brookline, Massachusetts. It is a rare local example of Greek Revival styling, and one of a few houses to survive from the residential development of the Linden Street area in the 1840s.

Description 
The -story wood-frame house was built in 1843, and faces Linden Park, part of the original subdivision; it has a fully pedimented gable end, a heavy cornice, and pilastered cornerboards. The first owner was Charles Scudder, a merchant working in Boston.

The house was listed on the National Register of Historic Places on October 17, 1985.

See also
National Register of Historic Places listings in Brookline, Massachusetts

References

Houses completed in 1843
Houses in Brookline, Massachusetts
National Register of Historic Places in Brookline, Massachusetts
Houses on the National Register of Historic Places in Norfolk County, Massachusetts
Greek Revival houses in Massachusetts